The 2015–16 Tennessee Volunteers basketball team represented the University of Tennessee in the 2015–16 NCAA Division I men's basketball season. The Volunteers were led by first-year head coach Rick Barnes. The team played its home games at Thompson–Boling Arena in Knoxville, Tennessee, as a member of the Southeastern Conference. They finished the season 15–19, 6–12 in SEC play to finish in 12th place. They defeated Auburn and Vanderbilt to advance to the  quarterfinals of the SEC tournament where they lost to LSU.

Previous season
The Vols posted a record of 16–16, 7–11 in SEC play in the 2014–15 season and finished in 10th place. They advanced to the quarterfinals of the SEC tournament where they lost to Arkansas.

Departures

Recruiting

Roster
}

Depth chart

Schedule

Tennessee has been invited to play in the Barclays Center Classic, where they will host two to-be-determined opponents and then play against two of these three teams in Brooklyn: Cincinnati, Nebraska, and George Washington. The Vols will travel on the road to play at Butler, Georgia Tech, and TCU. Tennessee will matchup with Gonzaga in neutral venue in the Battle in Seattle. Tennessee will also host Marshall, East Tennessee State, and Florida Atlantic.

|-
!colspan=12 style="background:#FF8200; color:white;"| Exhibition

|-
!colspan=12 style="background:#FF8200; color:white;"| Regular season

|-
!colspan=12 style="background:#FF8200; color:white;"| SEC tournament

References

Tennessee
Tennessee Volunteers basketball seasons
Volunteers
Volunteers